Philippe La Beaume de Bourgoing (1827–1882) was a French politician. He was the Grand Squire of France to Napoleon III, later serving as Inspector of the Haras Service before being elected five times as the Député for Nièvre in the French Parliament. Stemming from a noble family from the Nièvre, he became a Chevalier of the Légion d'Honneur in 1858, promoted to an officer in 1862.

His daughter Inès de Bourgoing gained fame as a pioneering nurse in Morocco.

The Baron died in Paris on 20 April 1882.

References

1827 births
1882 deaths
People from Nevers
Politicians from Bourgogne-Franche-Comté
Appel au peuple
Members of the 3rd Corps législatif of the Second French Empire
Members of the 4th Corps législatif of the Second French Empire
Members of the National Assembly (1871)
Members of the 1st Chamber of Deputies of the French Third Republic
Members of the 2nd Chamber of Deputies of the French Third Republic
Members of the 3rd Chamber of Deputies of the French Third Republic
Grand Officiers of the Légion d'honneur